Liparocephalini is a tribe of rove beetles in the family Staphylinidae. There are about 5 genera and more than 20 described species in Liparocephalini.

Genera
These five genera belong to the tribe Liparocephalini:
 Amblopusa Casey, 1893
 Diaulota Casey, 1893
 Liparocephalus Maklin, 1853
 Paramblopusa Ahn & Ashe, 1996
 Salinamexus Moore & Legner, 1977

References

Further reading

 
 
 
 
 
 

Aleocharinae